St Magnus Cathedral dominates the skyline of Kirkwall, the main town of Orkney, a group of islands off the north coast of mainland Scotland. It is the oldest cathedral in Scotland, and the most northerly cathedral in the United Kingdom, a fine example of Romanesque architecture built for the bishops of Orkney when the islands were ruled by the Norse Earls of Orkney. It is owned not by the church, but by the burgh of Kirkwall as a result of an act of King James III of Scotland following Orkney's annexation by the Scottish Crown in 1468. It has its own dungeon.

Construction began in 1137, and it was added to over the next 300 years. The first bishop was William the Old, and the diocese was under the authority of the Archbishop of Nidaros in Norway. It was for Bishop William that the nearby Bishop's Palace was built.

Before the Reformation, the cathedral was presided over by the Bishop of Orkney, whose seat was in Kirkwall. Today, it is a parish church of the Presbyterian Church of Scotland, and therefore technically no longer a cathedral.

Foundation
The Orkneyinga Saga tells how bloodthirsty intrigue and saintly piety led to the cathedral's foundation. Other accounts tell a similar, though slightly less saintly, tale.

Martyrdom of St Magnus
St Magnus had a reputation for piety and gentleness.  On a raid led by the King of Norway on Anglesey, Wales, Magnus refused to fight and stayed on board singing psalms. King Eystein II of Norway granted him a share of the earldom of Orkney held by his cousin Håkon, and they ruled amicably as joint Earls of Orkney from 1105 to 1114.  Their followers fell out, and the two sides met at a thing (assembly) on Orkney Mainland, ready to do battle. Peace was negotiated and the Earls arranged to meet each other on the small island of Egilsay, each bringing only two ships. Magnus arrived on 16 April 1116 (or 1117) with his two ships, but then Håkon treacherously turned up with eight ships. Magnus was captured and offered to go into exile or prison, but an assembly of chieftains insisted that one earl must die. Håkon's standard bearer refused to execute Magnus, and an angry Håkon made his cook Lifolf kill Magnus by striking him on the head with an axe.

Magnus was buried in the Christchurch at Birsay. The rocky area around his grave miraculously became a green field, and there were numerous reports of miraculous happenings and healings. William the Old, Bishop of Orkney, warned that it was "heresy to go about with such tales", then was struck blind in his Birsay cathedral and subsequently had his sight restored after praying at the grave of Magnus, not long after visiting Norway (and perhaps meeting Earl Rögnvald Kolsson).

Earl Rögnvald founds the cathedral
Gunhild, sister of Magnus, had married Kol, and the king of Norway granted their son Rögnvald Kolsson the right to his uncle's earldom in 1129. Earl Rögnvald eventually took a fleet to Orkney, but the islanders resisted and Earl Paul who had succeeded Håkon would not give up control without a fight. Then, Earl Rögnvald Kolsson was advised by his father Kol to promise the islanders to "build a stone minster at Kirkwall more magnificent than any in Orkney, that you'll have [it] dedicated to your uncle the holy Earl Magnus and provide it with all the funds it will need to flourish.  In addition, his holy relics and the episcopal seat must be moved there [from Birsay]".  Meanwhile, Rögnvald secretly had Paul kidnapped and shipped away, later to be murdered in Caithness. Rögnvald duly became Earl of Orkney.

In 1135, Magnus was canonised, with 16 April becoming St Magnus' day. His remains were moved east to St Olaf's Kirk in the small settlement known as Kirkjuvágr, meaning "church bay", now Kirkwall.

Work on the cathedral began in 1137, under the direction of Kol. When funds ran short, Kol advised Rögnvald to restore odal rights for cash payment. In 1158, while work was still under way, Rögnvald was killed by a Scottish chieftain. His bones were brought to the cathedral and he was canonised in 1192, though the records of his sainthood are missing. Rögnvald's bones were found and re-interred during work on the building in the 19th century.

Architecture and history

The Romanesque cathedral begun in 1137 has fine examples of Norman architecture, attributed to English masons who may have worked on Durham Cathedral. The masonry uses red sandstone quarried near Kirkwall and yellow sandstone from the island of Eday, often in alternating courses or in a chequerboard pattern to give a polychrome effect.

As completed during the 12th century, the original cathedral had three aisled bays to the chancel with the bay at the east end shorter, and apsed in a similar way to the original apse at Durham, a transept with single east chapel, and eight bays to the nave as at Durham and Dunfermline Abbey. When the cathedral was ready for consecration the relics of St Magnus were enshrined in it. In 1917, a hidden cavity in a column was found, containing a box with bones including a skull showing a wound consistent with a blow from an axe.

In the late 12th and early 13th century, the building was extended to the east with vaulting throughout, and, in the late 14th century, the present lower front was joined to the rest of the building. These later elements introduced the Gothic style with pointed arches.

In 1468, when Orkney was annexed for Scotland by King James III, St Magnus Cathedral came under the control of the Archbishop of St Andrews; the Bishops of Aberdeen and Orkney were subsequently of Scots rather than Scandinavian origin. Most notable amongst them was Bishop Robert Reid, who presided at St Magnus from 1541 to 1558.

Mary I of England sent a fleet to Scotland in 1557, commanded by William Woodhouse and John Clere. Clere's troops attacked the cathedral on 12 August. The force was overpowered on the next day and many of the retreating English drowned as they attempted to reach their ships.

The Protestant Reformation in 1560 had a less dramatic effect on St Magnus Cathedral than in some other parts of Scotland, but the church had a narrow escape in 1614. Government forces suppressing the rebellion of Robert, the son of Patrick Stewart, 2nd Earl of Orkney, had besieged and destroyed Kirkwall Castle and intended to destroy St. Magnus Cathedral after rebels had hidden inside. The bishop James Law intervened to prevent them from carrying out this plan.

Major work was undertaken on the cathedral in 1908 by the architect George Mackie Watson: this included replacing the dumpy slated pyramid atop the tower with a taller spire clothed in copper sheeting. As a result, today's cathedral looks much more as it did until its original spire was struck by lightning in the late 17th century. Restoration and renovation work on the building continues, with increased urgency since it was discovered in the 1970s that the west end of the cathedral was in danger of collapsing away from the remainder of the structure. Other work has progressed further, and to celebrate its 850th anniversary in 1987 Queen Elizabeth II unveiled a magnificent new west window.  St. Magnus is the only wholly mediaeval Scottish cathedral, and one of the best-preserved buildings of the era in Britain.

The cathedral contains memorials to prominent Orcadians including explorers William Balfour Baikie and Dr John Rae, writers Eric Linklater, George Mackay Brown and Edwin Muir, artist Stanley Cursiter and psychiatrist Sir Thomas Clouston.

Bishop's Palace
At the same time as the original cathedral was being constructed, the Bishop's Palace was built nearby for William the Old, with a large rectangular hall above vaulted store rooms.

King Haakon IV of Norway, overwintering after his defeat at the Battle of Largs, died here in December 1263, marking the end of Norse rule over the Outer Hebrides. The King was buried in St Magnus Cathedral until the weather was good enough to return his remains to Bergen.

The palace fell into ruins, then after 1540 was restored by Bishop Robert Reid who added a round tower, the "Moosie Toor". He presided at St Magnus from 1541 to 1558 and, incidentally, also founded the University of Edinburgh. The ruins of the Bishop's Palace are open to the public (see Historic Scotland). Opposite the Bishop's Palace, the ruins of the Earl's Palace give a reminder of the cruel reign of the Stewart Earls of Orkney during the late 16th and early 17th centuries; they too are open to the public.

Bells
There are four bells in St Magnus, donated in 1528 by Bishop Robert Maxwell. The smallest bell bears no inscription or date and was not hung. According to the antiquary Sir Henry Edward Leigh Dryden, fourth and seventh Dryden baronet (1818–1899), "They are not and probably never have been rung by the common processes of wheel or crank but by a rope applied so as by a lateral traction to make the tongue strike the side. One end of a short rope is fastened to the tongue and the other to the wall; a second rope is fastened to the middle of the first and the lower end of it pulled by the ringer, which of course pulls the tongue to one side. The notes produced by the bells are not at diatonic intervals, being about five quarter tones apart. They are about G ¼ tone sharp, A ½ tone sharp, С ¼ tone sharp. The second bell is used for the clock and is struck by the clock hammer on the outside, giving, when so struck, a note lower than that given when struck by the tongue."

Dryden notes that the third bell bears an inscription in plain capitals raised in two lines, rendered here in the original spelling: "Made by master Robbert Maxwell, Bischop of Orkney, the year of God MDXXVIII. the year of the reign of King James the V. Robert Borthwik made me in the castel of Edinburgh."

In 1671, when the tower of the church was struck by lightning and burned, the bells fell into the church. It is said that townspeople hurried soft material into the church to catch the bells, should they fall, but despite their efforts, the largest bell did suffer a rift.

Therefore, in July 1682, the church authorities contracted with Alexander Geddes, merchant in Kirkwall, to deliver the bell to Amsterdam, where it was recast by Claudius Fremy. On arrival in Amsterdam, the bell was weighed and was found to be . Geddes returned the bell to Kirkwall on 23 August of the same year.

Clock
The original turret clock was built in 1761 by an Aberdeen clockmaker named Hugh Gordon. The clock was refurbished with an automatic mechanism by James Ritchie & Son in 2018.

Organ
The organ was installed in 1925 and built by Henry Willis. It has been maintained by the same firm ever since. A specification of the organ can be found on the National Pipe Organ Register.

See also
 List of Church of Scotland parishes
 St Magnus Festival

References
Footnotes

Citations

General references
 
 Omand, Donald (ed.) (2003) The Orkney Book. Edinburgh. Birlinn.

External links

St. Magnus Cathedral Website
Orkney Heritage website
A detailed history of St. Magnus Cathedral
The Founding of St. Magnus Cathedral

12th-century church buildings in Scotland
14th-century church buildings in Scotland
Category A listed buildings in Orkney
Cathedrals of the Church of Scotland
Protestant churches converted from Roman Catholicism
Magnus
Medieval cathedrals in Scotland
Romanesque architecture in Scotland
Listed cathedrals in Scotland
Viking Age sites in Scotland
Sandstone churches in Scotland
Kirkwall